CWKS Resovia, Resovia, and Resovia Rzeszów can refer to:

Resovia (multisport club)
Resovia (basketball)
Resovia (football)
Resovia (volleyball)